Laura Boldrini,  (born 28 April 1961) is an Italian politician and former United Nations official, who served as President of the Chamber of Deputies of Italy.  Previously she served as Spokesperson to the United Nations High Commissioner for Refugees (UNHCR) for Southern Europe.

Biography

Born in Macerata, Marche, Boldrini graduated in Law from the Sapienza University of Rome in 1985. Afterwards, she was employed at the Italian public service broadcasting corporation RAI, working both for television and radio. In 1989 she was employed for four years at the Food and Agriculture Organization of the United Nations (FAO), where she was active in video and radio production.

From 1993 until 1998 she worked at the World Food Programme (WFP) as the Italian spokesperson. From 1998 to 2012 she was spokesperson of the High Commissioner for Refugees (UNHCR), for whom she also coordinated public information campaigns in Southern Europe. In recent years she has specifically dealt with the influx of migrants and refugees in the Mediterranean. She has taken part in numerous missions to crisis spots, including the former Yugoslavia, Afghanistan, Pakistan, Iraq, Iran, Sudan, Caucasus, Angola and Rwanda.

Political career 
Boldrini was elected to the Italian Chamber of Deputies in the 2013 parliamentary election as an independent candidate in the Left Ecology Freedom party list, who together with their coalition allies in the Democratic Party and in Italy Common Good held the majority of seats in the lower house. She represents the second electoral district of Sicily.

On 16 March 2013, following a meeting between the Democratic Party and Left Ecology Freedom, Boldrini was proposed by the coalition Italy Common Good as candidate for the Presidency of the Chamber of Deputies. She was elected President of the Chamber of Deputies on the same day, receiving 327 votes out of a possible 618. She is the third woman, after Nilde Iotti (1979 to 1992) and Irene Pivetti (1994–1996), to fill this role.

Boldrini has criticised "fake news", believing it to lead to forms of hate speech. She has proposed that Facebook be more active in regulating these forms of postings. She has been threatened online and in real life for her role in supporting immigrants' and women's rights.

In December 2020, Boldrini announced she was suing Lega Nord leader Matteo Salvini for allegedly saying that she supports ethnic replacement of Europeans, and for calling immigrant criminals "Boldrini's resources", based on a speech in which she called immigrants resources. A separate case against the Libero newspaper was dismissed in February 2022, for the 2018 headline "Desirée Mariottini, Laura Boldrini: her 'resources' rape and kill, but she goes on the attack against Salvini". The judge ruled that it was protected criticism of Boldrini's public and long-held pro-immigration views, and had not attributed blame to her.

Honours and decorations

National Honors
  : Knight of the Order of Merit of the Italian Republic on 26 February 2004
 , Montecassiano (MC) : Primadonna 2008
 : Renato Benedetto Fabrizi 2011

Foreign Honors
  : Honorary Citizen of the City of Kukës
  Order of Skanderbeg (Albania, 13 October 2016) – decorated by President of Albania Bujar Nishani

Writings

Books
  BUR edition: 2013. .

References

External links

  
  
  Official website on Facebook

1961 births
Living people
People from Macerata
Left Ecology Freedom politicians
Presidents of the Chamber of Deputies (Italy)
Deputies of Legislature XVII of Italy
Deputies of Legislature XVIII of Italy
Politicians of Marche
Italian journalists
Women legislative speakers
21st-century Italian women politicians
Sapienza University of Rome alumni
Knights of the Order of Merit of the Italian Republic
Recipients of the Order of Skanderbeg (1990–)
Women members of the Chamber of Deputies (Italy)